Narosodes metatroga is a moth of the family Erebidae. It was described by George Hampson in 1918. It is found on the Philippines.

References

 

Nudariina
Moths described in 1918